Eoophyla capensis is a moth in the family Crambidae. It was described by George Hampson in 1906. It is found in Angola, Cameroon, Ethiopia, Kenya, Liberia, Malawi, Mozambique, Namibia, Nigeria, South Africa, Tanzania, Uganda, Zambia and Zimbabwe.

The wingspan is 13–21 mm. The forewing costa is brownish with a pale yellow base. There is a brownish submedian fascia, followed by whitish scaling. The basal half of the hindwings is whitish with a brownish fascia and a yellow median fascia. Adults have been recorded on wing from January to August and from October to December.

References

Eoophyla
Moths described in 1906